Kelly Condron is a British television and voice actress. She is known for her role as Zara Morgan in the Channel 4 soap opera Hollyoaks (1999–2005, 2021–present). Prior to 2006, Condron used her previous surname "Greenwood" professionally.

Career
Condron grew up in Salford in the 1980s and decided she wanted to act from age twelve. She began taking acting lessons and the following year she secured the role of Geri in the ITV show Children's Ward.

In 1999, Condron secured the regular role of Zara Morgan, in the British soap opera Hollyoaks. In July 2005, it was reported that producers would not be renewing the contracts of several cast members, including Condron. She soon filmed her final scenes with the show.

In 2007, Condron was approached by the production company Endemol to provide voice overs for one of their relative television shows. The experience lead Condron to take up voice over work as her new career.

She has also had roles in the television series My Wonderful Life, Casualty and Heartbeat. In 2021, Condron rejoined the cast of Hollyoaks as Zara on a regular basis.

Filmography

Sources:

References

External links
Official Website

1982 births
Living people
English television actresses
English soap opera actresses
Actresses from Salford
Actresses from Lancashire